The Drips is an American punk rock band from Los Angeles, California, United States, currently signed to White Drugs/Wichita Recordings.

History 
A side-project of members of various other bands, The Drips  are Matt Caughthran and Joby J. Ford, both from The Bronx, Tony Bevilaqua from The Distillers, David Hidalgo Jr. from Suicidal Tendencies and Social Distortion and Vincent Hidalgo from Bullet Treatment and Mariachi el Bronx.  

Due to the touring duties of the members' different bands, The Drips were extremely inactive for their first five years. Their first album, self-titled "The Drips," was released in April 2006 mid-way through a UK tour. The album received many favorable reviews, with critics hailing their sound as "muscular and melodic... a thrilling blur"

The band reunited in 2016 for a handful of shows in their native California. Recordings from two shows were released digitally.

Discography 
 "Live Cuts" (White Drugs) digital-only - 2016
 "The Drips" (Riot Style) 2xLP Vinyl - scheduled September, 2010
 BBC Sessions - released 2009
 Broken (Wichita) 7" - released April 10, 2006
 The Drips (Wichita) album - released April 26, 2006
 16 16 Six (Wichita) 7" - released May 5, 2006
 Mexico (Hostage) 7" - released 2003

Videography 
 16, 16, Six (2006)

References

External links 
 
 

Musical groups from Los Angeles
Punk rock groups from California
Wichita Recordings artists